Jumli or Jumli Khas is an Indo-Aryan language of Nepal closely related to Nepali. It is primarily spoken in the Karnali Province of Nepal. The language is occasionally referred to as a dialect of Nepali language however Government of Nepal considers Jumli as a different language and the 2011 Nepal census put the number of native speakers at 851. The Khas language is known as the parent language of Nepali language.

Dialects 

 Asi Darali, spoken in 80 Dara, 500 Dara and Sinja Dara of Jumla district.
 Tribikoti, spoken in 1420 Dara of Jumla district and Dolpa District.
 Rasakoti, spoken in Kalikot District.
 Muhu, spoken in Mugu District and Humla District.

Script 
Jumli Khas language uses the Devanagari script.

History 
Khas language is considered to be the parent language of Nepali. The language is considered to developed in Sinja Valley of Karnali province.

2017 Proposed Phonology 
On 17 August 2017, a draft regarding 'Jumli Khas language writing style' was proposed. The draft proposed 29 consonants and 6 vowels for writing the language. According to Ramanand Acharya, a linguist and editor of the Jumli Khas dictionary, the proposed draft was prepared based on the Khas language and colloquial language and vernacular spoken in the then Karnali Khas Kingdom. However, on 15 August 2022, the Language Commission of Nepal finalized a phonology with 24 vowels and 41 consonant characters.

Vowels 
Unlike Nepali, Jumli Khas only have 6 oral vowels.

Consonants 

The standard record regarding the grammar and vocabulary was not collected  and standardized as of 2022. On 15 August 2022, at the initiative of the local government, the Language Commission started the process of documenting and archiving the language. According to proposal, 24 vowels and 41 consonant characters were finalized for developing writing system of the language.

Present status 
In 2020, twenty-eight schools in Tatopani Rural Municipality of Jumla District started teaching in Jumli Khas language.

Dictionary 
In 2008, Ramanand Acharya started compiling the first ever Jumli Khas Dictionary titled Khasiya Akhar. Khas means Khas people and Aakhar means word or a letter. As of 2019, he had collected around 25 thousands words. The collection process has been at a slow rate due to lack of funding. The Karnali Province government allocated funds for the process in the budget of the fiscal year 2077/2078 BS (2020/2021).

References

Indo-Aryan languages
Languages of Nepal
Languages of Karnali Province